Ageyevo is the name of several inhabited localities in Russia.

Urban localities
Ageyevo, Tula Oblast, a work settlement in Suvorovsky District of Tula Oblast

Rural localities
Ageyevo, Sanchursky District, Kirov Oblast, a village in Shishovsky Rural Okrug of Sanchursky District in Kirov Oblast; 
Ageyevo, Slobodskoy District, Kirov Oblast, a village in Ozernitsky Rural Okrug of Slobodskoy District in Kirov Oblast; 
Ageyevo, Republic of Mordovia, a village in Akselsky Selsoviet of Temnikovsky District in the Republic of Mordovia; 
Ageyevo, Perm Krai, a village in Vereshchaginsky District of Perm Krai
Ageyevo, Tver Oblast, a village in Shchucheyskoye Rural Settlement of Zharkovsky District in Tver Oblast
Ageyevo, Belozersky District, Vologda Oblast, a village in Gulinsky Selsoviet of Belozersky District in Vologda Oblast
Ageyevo, Velikoustyugsky District, Vologda Oblast, a village in Viktorovsky Selsoviet of Velikoustyugsky District in Vologda Oblast
Ageyevo, Yaroslavl Oblast, a village in Levashovsky Rural Okrug of Nekrasovsky District in Yaroslavl Oblast